Mansell is a surname. Notable people with the surname include:

 Clint Mansell (born 1963), British musician and composer
 Chris Mansell (born 1953), Australian poet
 Christian Mansell (born 2005), Australian racing driver
 Francis Mansell (1579–1665), Principal of Jesus College, Oxford
 Gerard Mansell (1921-2010), Managing Director of External Broadcasting and Deputy Director-General of the BBC
 Greg Mansell (born 1987), British racing driver
 Most Rev. Henry J. Mansell (born 1937), Archbishop of Hartford, Connecticut and former Bishop of Buffalo, New York
 Jessica Mansell (born 1989), Australian netball player
 Lee Mansell (born 1982), British footballer
 Leo Mansell (born 1985), British racing driver
 Nigel Mansell (born 1953), British racing driver 
 Peter Mansell, bassist for English rock band Pulp
 Percy Mansell (1920–1995), South African cricketer
 Richard Mansell (1813–1904), British railway engineer
 Sir Robert Mansell (1573–1656), Royal Navy admiral and British member of parliament
 Scott Mansell (born 1985), British racing driver

See also
Mansell Street, London
Mansell wheel, railway wheel invented by Richard Mansell

See also
Mansel, surname
Maunsell, surname